"After the Glitter Fades" is a 1981 song by the American singer/songwriter Stevie Nicks. It was the fourth and final single from her debut solo album, Bella Donna.

Reception
Cash Box called it "a plaintive rock lament" that "captures that unique Nicks magic."

Charts
"After the Glitter Fades" was released April 30, 1982 and peaked at No. 32 on the Billboard Hot 100 and reached No. 36 spot on the Billboard Adult Contemporary chart. The song also peaked at #70 on the Billboard Hot Country Tracks.

Cover versions
The song was covered by American singer Glen Campbell on his album Letter to Home in 1984.

References

Stevie Nicks songs
Glen Campbell songs
1981 singles
Songs written by Stevie Nicks
Song recordings produced by Jimmy Iovine
1981 songs
Modern Records (1980) singles
Country rock songs